Chunchenan (also Romanized as Chūnchenān and Chūnechenān; also known as Bandar-e Chūnchenān, Chunchunīān, Chūnehchenān, Chyunchunchian, and Sheylāt-e Chūnechenān) is a village in Aliabad-e Ziba Kenar Rural District, Lasht-e Nesha District, Rasht County, Gilan Province, Iran. At the 2006 census, its population was 1,146, in 338 families.

References 

Populated places in Rasht County